= Gahlon =

Coordinates: 26°32′N 79°58′E

- Village
- Interactive map of Gahlon
- Country: India

Gahlon is a village in Uttar Pradesh, India.
